The 1994 Mallala ATCC round was the eighth round of the 1994 Australian Touring Car Championship. It was held on the weekend of 24 to 26 July at Mallala Motor Sport Park in Mallala, South Australia.

Race results

Race 1 
Neil Crompton got off to a flyer, thanks to the intermediate tires and began pulling away immediately. With the track drying out, Seton began to reel Crompton in, and after a few laps, passed him for the lead. Meanwhile, both the Gibson Motorsport cars were moving up the pack and with the rain starting to come back, the dynamic of the race began to change. Skaife took the lead from Seton, who began to struggle on the slick tires, and Richards followed shortly thereafter. Crompton spun at turn two, ripping the front spoiler off and retired shortly thereafter. Skaife began the final lap in the lead, but would end up losing the race on the last section of the circuit as teammate Richards passed him, taking his first win of the season.

Race 2 
Skaife led off the line, with Seton in second and Richards in third. Bowe would retire from the race after the rear spoiler became dislodged from the Dick Johnson Racing Falcon. Perkins and Richards were locked in an intense battle for the final podium spot, which ultimately saw Perkins emerging victorious. Tomas Mezera retired from the race following terminal problems with his Commodore. Seton's campaign went up in smoke as his Peter Jackson Falcon caught fire, which effectively gave Skaife a clean run to the line. Skaife was the victor, Perkins in second and Jim Richards in third.

Championship Standings 

Drivers' Championship standings

References

External links 

Mallala